Teensville is the twelfth studio album recorded by American guitarist and producer Chet Atkins, released in 1960. The idea here was for Atkins to release a record appealing to teens who were now interested in rock 'n roll. The original version of "Oh Lonesome Me", a hit on both the pop and country charts for Don Gibson, was produced by Atkins and featured his guitar.

The original liner notes were by The Everly Brothers whom Atkins later produced.

Reception

In his review for Allmusic, critic Stephen Thomas Erlewine wrote Atkins "never captures the raw spark of rock & roll. What shines through is Atkins' understated elegance. All of the numbers are arranged as pop instrumentals and his guitar playing is so tasteful that it makes the half-hearted execution almost forgiveable."

Reissues
 Teensville was re-released on CD in 1998 by BMG International.

Track listing

Side one
 "White Silver Sands" (Charles "Red" Matthews) – 2:19
 "Boo Boo Stick Beat" (Buddy Harman, John D. Loudermilk) – 2:11
 "Oh Lonesome Me" (Don Gibson) – 2:20
 "One Mint Julep" (Rudy Toombs) – 2:09
 "Take a Message to Mary" (Felice Bryant, Boudleaux Bryant) – 2:21
 "Teensville" (Wayne Cogswell) – 2:16

Side two
 "Night Train" (Jimmy Forrest, Lewis Simpkins) – 2:36
 "Come Softly to Me" (Gretchen Christoper, Barbara Ellis, Gary Troxel) – 2:01
 "Sleep Walk" (Santo & Johnny) – 2:33
 "Django's Castle" (Django Reinhardt) – 2:32
 "Till There Was You" (Meredith Willson) – 2:30
 "Hot Toddy" (Ralph Flanagan) – 2:22

Personnel
Chet Atkins – guitar

Production notes
Bill Porter – engineer

References

1960 albums
Chet Atkins albums
Albums produced by Chet Atkins
RCA Victor albums